The 18th Infantry Division (18-ya Pekhotnaya Diviziya) was an infantry formation of the Russian Imperial Army during World War I and the Russian Civil War.

It was formed in 1806 as the 10th Infantry Division. It was renumbered in several subsequent reorganizations, becoming the 15th in 1820, the 12th in 1833, and the 18th in 1835.

By 1914 it was part of the 14th Army Corps at Lublin.

Organization

1st Brigade (Lublin)
69th Ryazan Infantry Regiment (Lublin)
70th Ryazhsk Infantry Regiment (Siedlce)
2nd Brigade (Ivangorod)
71st Belyov Infantry Regiment (Novaya Aleksandria)
72nd Tula Infantry Regiment (Ivangorod)
18th Artillery Brigade

Commanders
1901-1906: Vladimir Vasilyevich Smirnov
1907-1908: Yakov Schkinsky

References

Infantry divisions of the Russian Empire
Military units and formations disestablished in 1918